KJCK may refer to:

 KJCK-FM, a radio station (97.5 FM) located in Junction City, Kansas, United States
 KJCK (AM), a radio station (1420 AM) located in Junction City, Kansas, United States

See also
 CJCK-FM, callsign JCK in region C
 WJCK (disambiguation), callsign JCK in region W